The magnificent web-footed salamander (Bolitoglossa magnifica) is a species of salamander in the family Plethodontidae.
It is endemic to Panama.
Its natural habitat is subtropical or tropical moist montane forests.
It is threatened by habitat loss.

References

Bolitoglossa
Endemic fauna of Panama
Taxonomy articles created by Polbot
Amphibians described in 2005